Bargis were a light cavalry mercenary group of Maratha Empire's who indulged in large scale plundering of the countryside of western part of Bengal for about ten years (1741–1751) during the Maratha invasions of Bengal. Maratha invasions took place almost as an annual event for 10 years.

Etymology 
According to historians the term Bargi comes from the Hindustani word bargi, which described cavalry whose equipment and horses were provided by the government. The bargi were distinct from the shiledars, who owned their equipment and horses. Bargi are also known as Jogi or Gosain in Eastern Bundelkhand region.

History 
Alivardi Khan became Nawab of Bengal in April 1740 by defeating and killing Sarfaraz Khan. His seizure of power was challenged by Sarfaraz Khan's brother-in-law Rustam Jung, who enlisted the backing of Raghoji I Bhonsle, the Maratha ruler of Nagpur. Historians writes that in the ensuing campaign, the Marathas "discovered the Bengal's rich countryside through lightning raids".  Maratha cavalry  pillaged the army of the Nawab on being requested by Rustam Jung. In April 1742, they crossed the Damodar River at Panchet and began looting and burning the army of the Nawab. The Maratha Ditch was built by the British East India Company around Fort William to protect the city of Calcutta from the ruthless Bargi raids.

For about ten years, the Bargis raided and plundered the army of the Nawab, every year. Contemporary sources describe the ineffectiveness of the nawab's army in the face of the Bargis' hit-and-run tactics. The raiders' aim was not battle or conquest, but to plunder the Nawab's territories.

Alivardi's soldiers could not match the Maratha horsemen in speed and maneuverability. Only the Ganges-Bhagirathi river line restrained them. They crossed it to raid eastern Bengal only a few times.

The Bargi invasions ended in May 1751 when the Nawab and the Marathas made peace.

The Bargi remained in the cultural memory of the Bengali people in the form of songs and poems. One traditional song, translated, reads:

See also
 Maratha Ditch
 Bengal Subah
 Pindari

References

Bengal Subah
Dhangar
Looting